Dimas Juliono Pamungkas (born 31 July 2004) is an Indonesian professional footballer who plays as a defensive midfielder, left-back or centre-back for Liga 1 club Bhayangkara and the Indonesia national under-20 team.

Club career

Bhayangkara
He was signed for Bhayangkara to play in Liga 1 in the 2022 season. Dimas made his league debut on 8 December 2022 in a match against Bali United at the Manahan Stadium, Surakarta.

International career
On 30 May 2022, Dimas made his debut for an Indonesian U20 team against a Venezuela U-20 squad in the 2022 Maurice Revello Tournament in France. In October 2022, it was reported that Kakang received a call-up from the Indonesia U-20 for a training camp, in Turkey and Spain.

Career statistics

Club

Notes

Honours

International 
Indonesia U-16
 AFF U-16 Youth Championship third place: 2019

References

External links
 Dimas Pamungkas at Soccerway
 Dimas Pamungkas at Liga Indonesia

2004 births
Living people
Indonesian footballers
People from Tasikmalaya
Sportspeople from West Java
Liga 1 (Indonesia) players
Persib Bandung players
Association football midfielders
Indonesia youth international footballers